Ainapur may refer to:
Ainapur, Athni, a village in Beglaum district, Karnataka, India
Ainapur, Bijapur, a village in Bijapur district, Karnataka, India
Ainapur, Chincholi, a village in Gulbarga district, Karnataka, India
Ainapur, Jevargi, a village in Gulbarga district, Karnataka, India
Ainapur, Shorapur, a village in Gulbarga district, Karnataka, India